Daniel Clayton Miller (born July 1, 1991) was an American professional basketball player. Standing 6'11" (2.11 m), Miller played the center position. He played college basketball for Georgia Tech.

College career
A 6'11" center from Loganville Christian Academy in Loganville, Georgia, Miller came to Georgia Tech in 2010 after originally committing to the University of Georgia. Known for his defensive prowess, Miller earned Atlantic Coast Conference All-Defensive Team honors as a junior and senior, and led the conference in blocked shots both seasons. He was also named third-team All-ACC by the league's media in 2013–14. In 126 games over four years playing for the Yellow Jackets, Miller averaged 8.0 points, 6.5 rebounds, 1.5 assists, 1.0 steals and 2.3 blocks per game.

Professional career
After going undrafted in the 2014 NBA draft, Miller joined the Washington Wizards for the 2014 NBA Summer League. On August 10, 2014, he signed with Río Natura Monbús Obradoiro of Spain for the 2014–15 ACB season. In 33 games for Obradoiro, he averaged 3.6 points and 2.7 rebounds per game.

On August 5, 2015, Miller signed with Akhisar Belediyespor of Turkey for the 2015–16 TBL season. He left the club in late December 2015 after appearing in 13 games. Over that time, he averaged 10.9 points, 7.1 rebounds, 1.1 assists and 1.6 blocks per game.

On February 25, 2016, Miller signed with the Taranaki Mountainairs for the 2016 New Zealand NBL season. He helped the Mountainairs have their best season since 2008, with their 8–10 record finishing just one win shy of a playoff berth. Miller appeared in all 18 games for the team, averaging 13.9 points, 10.6 rebounds, 2.4 assists, 1.1 steals and a league-leading 1.9 blocks per game.

In August 2016, Miller signed with the Levanga Hokkaido of the Japanese B.League.

Career statistics 

|-
| align="left" |  2016-17
| align="left" | Hokkaido
| 60 || 59 || 29.5 || .522 || .000 || .737 || 8.5 || 1.6 || 1.2 || 1.6 ||  13.8
|-
| align="left" | 2017-18
| align="left" | Hokkaido
| 60 || 28 || 21.5 || .590 || .000 || .671 || 6.6 || 1.5 || .8 || 1.1|| 9.9
|-

References

External links
 Georgia Tech Yellow Jackets bio
 Miller relishing role as defensive anchor

1991 births
Living people
American expatriate basketball people in Japan
American expatriate basketball people in New Zealand
American expatriate basketball people in Spain
American expatriate basketball people in Turkey
American men's basketball players
Basketball players from Georgia (U.S. state)
Centers (basketball)
Georgia Tech Yellow Jackets men's basketball players
Levanga Hokkaido players
Liga ACB players
Obradoiro CAB players
People from Loganville, Georgia
Sendai 89ers players
Basketball players from Denver
Sportspeople from the Atlanta metropolitan area
Taranaki Mountainairs players